Bruce Osborne Phillips (2 May 1929 – 18 October 2014) was an Australian rules footballer who played with St Kilda in the Victorian Football League.

A fullback, Phillips won St Kilda's best and fairest award in 1950 and finished equal third in the Brownlow Medal count that year.

Phillips, who was a VFL representative in interstate football, played 115 games for St Kilda before a knee injury ended his career.

In 2008 Phillips was inducted into St Kilda's Hall of Fame. He died aged 85 in 2014.

References

External links

Profile at the Saints player encyclopedia

1929 births
Australian rules footballers from Victoria (Australia)
St Kilda Football Club players
Trevor Barker Award winners
2014 deaths